Spectrunculus is a genus of cusk-eels found in the Atlantic and Pacific Oceans.

Species
There are currently two recognized species in this genus:
 Spectrunculus crassus (Vaillant, 1888)
 Spectrunculus grandis (Günther, 1877) (Pudgy cusk-eel)

References

Ophidiidae
Taxa named by David Starr Jordan